Jack Lake is a lake in Nipissing District in Northeastern Ontario, Canada.

The primary inflow is an unnamed stream arriving at the east, and the primary outflow is Jack Creek leaving at the east. Jack Creek flows to Mew Lake, continues to the North Madawaska River, and then via the Madawaska River and the Ottawa River to the Saint Lawrence River.

The Hemlock Bluff Trail, a  loop, leads from Highway 60 to the lake, including along a bluff on the southeast side of the lake

See also
List of lakes in Ontario

References

Lakes of Nipissing District